Connor McAliskey is a Gaelic footballer who plays for the Clonoe club and the Tyrone county team.	

McAliskey started at corner-forward for Tyrone in the 2018 All-Ireland Final defeat to Dublin.	

In November 2019, he left the squad ahead of the 2020 season to take a year out, with the intention of returning in 2021.

References

Living people
Tyrone inter-county Gaelic footballers
Year of birth missing (living people)